The 1994 Holy Cross Crusaders football team was an American football team that represented the College of the Holy Cross as a member of the Patriot League during the 1994 NCAA Division I-AA football season. In their third year under head coach Peter Vaas, the Crusaders compiled a 3–8 record and were outscored 327 to 175. Their 3–2 conference record, however, tied for second in the six-team Patriot League standings. 

Holy Cross played its home games at Fitton Field on the college's campus in Worcester, Massachusetts. Pat Smith and Chris Nichol were the team captains.

Schedule

References

Holy Cross
Holy Cross Crusaders football seasons
Holy Cross Crusaders football